Events in the year 1730 in Norway.

Incumbents
Monarch: Frederick IV (until 12 October); then Christian VI

Events

Arts and literature

Births

Full date unknown
Kristofer Sjursson Hjeltnes, farmer and businessperson (died 1804)

Deaths